Michelle Tuzee  is an American television news anchor. Tuzee co-anchored   KABC's Eyewitness News at 5 p.m. and 11 p.m. with Marc Brown. On December 17, 2020, she announced that health issues have forced her to step back from her anchor duties.

Biography

Tuzee graduated with a Bachelor of Arts degree from the University of Southern California where she majored in Journalism. Tuzee's first job in television news was at KJCT in Grand Junction, Colorado. She was a general assignment reporter and later a producer and anchor. These positions led to a market job with WBAY-TV, Green Bay, Wisconsin where she worked as a reporter.  She would go on to work as an anchor/reporter at WFTX-TV in Fort Myers, Florida and WSVN in Miami, where she anchored the top-rated "Today in Florida" and "7 News at Noon."  

In 1997, Michelle joined KABC as an anchor. She received an Emmy award as part of the team win for Best Newscast, an Associated Press award for excellence in reporting, and a Telly Award for her work with Children's Hospital Los Angeles.

On December 18, 2020, Tuzee stepped back from her duties as news anchor due to health concerns.

References

External links
Michelle Tuzee Bio: https://abc7.com/about/newsteam/michelle-tuzee/

Living people
Television anchors from Los Angeles
Television anchors from Miami
USC Annenberg School for Communication and Journalism alumni
Year of birth missing (living people)